Fernão do Pó (fl. 1472), also known as Fernão Pó, Fernando Pó or Fernando Poo, was a 15th-century Portuguese navigator and explorer of the West African coast. He was the first European to see the islands in the Gulf of Guinea around 1472, one of which until the mid-1900s bore a version of his name, Fernando Pó or Fernando Poo. The island is now named Bioko and is part of Equatorial Guinea. His name had also been given to several other places in nearby Cameroon; the village of Fernando Pó, Portugal; and the village of Fernando Pó, Sierra Leone.

Biography

Little is known about him or his life. He was one of the navigators working for Fernão Gomes, joining João de Santarém, Pedro Escobar, Lopo Gonçalves, and Pedro de Sintra, a merchant from Lisbon who was granted a monopoly over trade in part of the Gulf of Guinea. He was among a number of navigators who explored the Gulf of Guinea during this period on behalf of King Afonso V of Portugal.

Fernando Pó is credited as being the first European explorer to explore the south western coast of Africa. Before Fernando Pó, Europeans believed Africa was a large island. Pó explored the western "elbow" of the continent and the long southwestern coast.

See also
Annobón
Bight of Bonny
Bioko
Cameroon line
Equatorial Guinea
Fernandino peoples
Gulf of Guinea
Colonial São Tomé and Príncipe

References
Liniger-Goumaz, Max. 1979. Historical dictionary of Equatorial Guinea. Metuchen, N.J. (USA): Scarecrow Press. .
Room, Adrian. 1994. African placenames. Jefferson, N.C. (USA): McFarland. 

Portuguese explorers
Portuguese navigators
15th-century explorers of Africa
15th-century Portuguese people
Bioko
History of Central Africa
History of Equatorial Guinea
History of Malabo
History of São Tomé and Príncipe
Maritime history of Portugal